Yonghe District is an urban area in the southern part of New Taipei, Taiwan. Yonghe District is the smallest district in New Taipei City. It is primarily a mixed residential and commercial area. With around 38,000 inhabitants per square kilometer as of 2019, Yonghe is one of the most densely populated urban areas in the world.

History
On 1 January 1979, Yonghe was upgraded from an urban township to a county-administered city of Taipei County. With the changing of Taipei County to the special municipality of New Taipei City on 25 December 2010, Yonghe City was changed to Yonghe District.

Geology
The Xindian River forms a natural boundary between Yonghe and Taipei City to the north and east, although three bridges connect the two areas. To the south and west lies Zhonghe District, which shares some administration and facilities with Yonghe.

Notable products
The city is famous for its soy milk, and breakfast stores advertising "Yonghe Soy Milk" can be found all over Taiwan.

Government agencies
 Atomic Energy Council

Tourist attractions
 Lehua Night Market
 Museum of World Religions
 Weiming Temple/Hall of Martial Brilliance
 Baofu Temple
 Boai Arts Street
 Renai Park
 Yonghe Community University Wetland Ecology Experimental Farm

Transportation

Yonghe is served by the Zhonghe-Xinlu Line of the Taipei Metro, two stations of which are located in the district: Yongan Market and Dingxi. In addition, Fuhe Bridge passes through Yonghe and has an interchange there, as does the MacAuthur 1st & 2nd bridges .

Three major bridges connect Yonghe with other districts:
 Yongfu Bridge (永福橋) - Zhongxiao Xinsheng, Zhongzheng and Daan districts, Taipei
 Fuhe Bridge (福和橋) - Gongguan and Taipower Building, Zhongzheng and Daan districts, Taipei
 Zhongzheng Bridge (中正橋) - Xiaonanmen, Zhongzheng District, Taipei
 Yongle Bridge (永利橋) - Guting and Dongmen, Zhongzheng and Daan districts, Taipei

Education

Yonghe is where Xiulang Elementary School (aka Shou-lang Elementary School) is located. Xiulang was once the world's largest elementary school by number of students.

Notable natives
 Jay Shih, actor, singer and TV host
 Megan Lai, singer and actress
 Stephanie Shiao, actress, model, singer and writer
 Yang San-lang, former painter

References

Districts of New Taipei